Brian Parkin (born 12 October 1965 in Birkenhead, Cheshire) is the football academy director at Team Bath and a former professional goalkeeper.

Parkin began his career at Oldham Athletic. He was on the books of eight different teams, although he never made an appearance for Brighton & Hove Albion or Yeovil Town, despite being contracted to them. The bulk of his career was spent at Bristol Rovers, for whom he made 246 appearances in two spells. In his second period at Bristol Rovers he was primarily the goalkeeping coach, but also made a handful of appearances for the first team.

After leaving Bristol Rovers, Parkin joined Team Bath F.C., where he is now the football academy director.

References

External links

1965 births
Living people
Sportspeople from Birkenhead
English footballers
Association football goalkeepers
Oldham Athletic A.F.C. players
Crewe Alexandra F.C. players
Crystal Palace F.C. players
Bristol Rovers F.C. players
Wycombe Wanderers F.C. players
Notts County F.C. players
Yeovil Town F.C. players
Brighton & Hove Albion F.C. players